Novoselova is a rural locality (a village) in Oshibskoye Rural Settlement, Kudymkarsky District, Perm Krai, Russia. The population was 82 as of 2010. There are 6 streets.

Geography 
Novoselova is located 40 km northeast of Kudymkar (the district's administrative centre) by road. Novaya Shlyapina is the nearest rural locality.

References 

Rural localities in Kudymkarsky District